Berisha is an Albanian surname derived from the Berisha tribe in northern Albania. It is found mainly in northern Albania and Kosovo. It may refer to:

 Anton Berisha (born 1946), Albanian scholar and folklorist
 Behar Berisha (born 1991), Swiss footballer
 Bekim Berisha (1966-1998), Kosovar soldier
 Bernard Berisha (born 1991), Kosovar footballer
 Besart Berisha (born 1985), Kosovar Albanian footballer 
 Dardan Berisha (born 1988), Polish Kosovar basketball player
 Ergün Berisha (born 1988), Turkish footballer
 Etrit Berisha (born 1989), Albanian footballer
 Fadil Berisha (born 1973), Albanian American photographer
 Florian Berisha (born 1990), Swiss footballer 
 Ilir Berisha (born 1991), Kosovar Albanian footballer
 Johan Berisha (born 1979), Swiss footballer
 Kolë Berisha (born 1947), Kosovar politician
 Liri Berisha (born 1948), Albanian pediatrician and wife of Sali Berisha
 Mërgim Berisha (born 1998), German footballer of Albanian descent
 Safet Berisha (born 1949), Albanian footballer
 Sali Berisha (born 1944), Albanian Former Prime Minister
 Sedat Berisha (born 1989), Macedonian footballer
 Valmir Berisha (born 1996), Swedish footballer
 Valon Berisha (born 1993), Kosovar footballer 
 Veton Berisha (born 1994), Norwegian footballer
 Visar Berisha (born 1986), Kosovar footballer
 Yllka Berisha (born 1988), Swedish Albanian model and singer
 Zana Berisha (born 1995), Kosovo Albanian model

Albanian-language surnames